This is a partial list of symbols and labels used by political parties and groups around the world. Some symbols are associated with a worldwide ideology or movement, and used by many parties that support that ideology. Others are country-specific.

Colors

Worldwide 

Black – anarchism, Black nationalism, Arab nationalism, Islamism, pirate parties
Blue – conservatism, Zionism, men's rights movement, Pro-Europeanism, American liberalism
Brown – nazism, fascism
Gold – capitalism, right-libertarianism, classical liberalism
Green – environmentalism, Islamism, capitalism, agrarianism, green anarchism, green politics, anarcho-primitivism, anarcho-egoism, Black nationalism, Arab nationalism
Grey – independent politicians
Lavender – LGBT movements, Transgender rights movement
Magenta – centrism
Orange – Christian democracy, populism, mutualist anarchism, Classical Liberalism
Pink – feminism, LGBT movements, Transgender rights movement
Purple – monarchism, royalism
Red – democratic socialism, socialism, communism, social democracy, Zionism, Arab nationalism, American conservatism
Saffron – Hindu nationalism
White – monarchism, pacifism, White nationalism, Zionism, Arab nationalism, anti-communism, independent politicians
Yellow – liberalism, right-libertarianism

Australia 

  Blue – The Liberal Party
  Red – The Labor Party
  Green – The Greens
   Green and yellow – The National Party

Bangladesh 

   Blue, red and green – Bangladesh Nationalist Party
 Fern Green – Bangladesh Jamaat Islami
 Green – Bangladesh Awami League
 Yellow – Jatiyo Party

Canada 

 Blue – Conservative Party of Canada
 Green – Green Party of Canada
 Light blue – Bloc Québécois
 Orange – New Democratic Party
 Red – Liberal Party of Canada
 Purple - People's Party of Canada

India 

 Blue – Bahujan Samaj Party
 Blue – Mizo National Front
   Blue, red, and green – Lok Janshakti Party
   Blue, white, and green – Yuvajana Sramika Rythu Congress Party
 Bright green – All India Trinamool Congress
 Deep green – Biju Janata Dal
 Green – Aam Aadmi Party
 Green – All India Anna Dravida Munnetra Kazhagam
 Green – All India Majlis-e-Ittehadul Muslimeen, Janata Dal (Secular)
 Green – Jharkhand Mukti Morcha
 Green – National People's Party (India)
  Green and yellow – Rashtriya Loktantrik Party
  Maize and green – Indigenous People's Front of Tripura
  Navy blue and orange – Shiromani Akali Dal
 Pacific Blue – Nationalist Congress Party
 Pink – Janta Congress Chhattisgarh, Telangana Rashtra Samithi
 Red – All India Forward Bloc, Communist Party of India, Communist Party of India (Marxist), Left Front, Revolutionary Socialist Party (India)
 Red – Sikkim Krantikari Morcha
  Red and black – Dravida Munnetra Kazhagam
  Red and green – Samajwadi Party
  Red and white – Nationalist Democratic Progressive Party
  Saffron and green – Bharatiya Janata Party
 Sky blue – Indian National Congress
 White – other parties and independents
 Yellow – Telugu Desam Party
  Yellow and green – Jannayak Janta Party

Ireland 

 Blue – Fine Gael
 Dark green – Sinn Féin
 Green – Fianna Fáil
  Green and gold – Green Party
 Maroon – Solidarity–People Before Profit
 Purple – Social Democrats
 Red – Labour Party

The Netherlands 

 Maroon – Forum for Democracy
    Red, white, and blue – Party for Freedom
  Navy and red – JA21
 Green – Farmer–Citizen Movement
 Orange – Reformed Political Party
  Orange and blue – People's Party for Freedom and Democracy
 Green – Christian Democratic Appeal
  Azure and navy – Christian Union
 Turquoise – DENK
 Purple – Volt
 Green – Democrats 66
 Red – Labour Party
  Green and red – GreenLeft
 Green – Party for the Animals
 Red – Socialist Party
  Black and yellow – BIJ1

Portugal 

  Red (official) and Pink (customary) – Socialist Party
 Orange – Social Democratic Party
  Red (official) and Maroon (customary) - Left Bloc
 Red – Portuguese Communist Party
 Sky blue – CDS – People's Party
 Teal – People Animals Nature
 Green – Ecologist Party "The Greens"
 Dark blue – Chega
 Sky blue – Liberal Initiative
 Red – Portuguese Workers' Communist Party
 Blue – People's Monarchist Party
 Green – Earth Party
 Green – Together for the People

Sweden 

 Blue – Moderate Party
  Blue and white – Christian Democrats
  Blue and white – Liberals
 Green – Centre Party
 Green – Green Party
  Orange and blue – Alliance
 Pink – Feminist Initiative
 Purple – Pirate Party
 Red – Left Party
 Red – Swedish Social Democratic Party
  Red and green – Red-Greens
  Yellow and light-blue – Sweden Democrats

Turkey 

 Blue – Good Party
 Red – Nationalist Movement Party
 Red – Republican People's Party
 Purple – Peoples' Democratic Party
 Yellow – Justice and Development Party

United Kingdom 

  Blue – Conservative Party
  Green – Green Party
   Green and yellow – Plaid Cymru
  Orange – Liberal Democrats
   Purple and yellow – UKIP
  Red – Labour Party
    Red, white, and blue – DUP
   Turquoise and white – Reform UK
   Yellow and black – SNP
  Orange - Breakthrough Party

United States 

  Blue – Democratic Party
   Blue and buff – Whig Party (United States)
  Gold with dark grey, sometimes with dark blue or purple – Libertarian Party
  Green – Green Party
  Orange – American Solidarity Party (Christian democracy),  Modern Whig Party
  Purple – politically mixed or moderate regions; Constitution Party, Veterans Party of America
  Red – Republican Party
   Teal and white – Justice Party
   White or gray – senior citizens, women's voting rights, third parties (other than the Greens), independent candidates and voters

Icons

Worldwide

 a³ (lowercase a, cubed) – Agorism 
 Baphomet - Knights Templar
 Beehive - Co-operative Movement
 Bird in flight – Classical Liberalism, Right-libertarianism
 Black flag – Anarchism
 Black sail – pirate parties
 Bear – Putinism, Russian conservatism
 Black sun – Neo-nazism, White nationalism
 Carnation – Social Democracy and Democratic Socialism
 Cat, wildcat – worker collectivism, symbol of Industrial Workers of the World; Georgism
 Celtic cross – white nationalism, Neo-Nazism, Irish nationalism
 Christian cross – Christianity
 Circumscribed A – anarchism
 Cross of Lorraine – Gaullism
 Crown – Monarchism
 Dove – love and/or peace (often used by pacifist groups)
 Eagle – Nationalism, Patriotism, Conservatism
 Fasces – Fascism
 Fist and rose — Socialism and social democracy
 Four-leaf clover – Agrarianism
 Globe – Globalism, Neoliberalism
 Hammer and sickle – Marxism–Leninism and Communism
 Nordic cross – nordic model social democracy
 Peace sign – peace, pacifism, nuclear disarmament
 Poppy - Remembrance, WW1 and WW2
 Rainbow or Rainbow flag – LGBT rights
 Raised fist – solidarity, syndicalism, unity, resistance, communism, radicalism in general 
 Red flag – socialism or communism
 Red star – socialism, Marxism, or communism
 Rose – social democracy and democratic socialism
 Runic letters – various letters of the runic alphabet - particularly the Algiz, Eihwaz, Odal, Sowilō, and Tiwaz runes - have been used by various neo-nazi and white supremacist groups post-WW2
 Smiling Sun – anti-nuclear movement
 Star of David - Zionism
 Sunflower – Green politics
 Swastika – Nazism, fascism, neo-nazism; Hindu, Jain, or Buddhist theology (original use)
 Throne, sword and altar - Conservatism
 Three Arrows – mid 20th century European social democracy; the arrows represent anti-fascism, anti-communism, and anti-monarchism
 Torch – right-libertarianism, conservatism, patriotism, classical liberalism
 Upside-down Crown - republicanism, anti-monarchism
 Venus symbol – feminism
 Venus symbol and raised fist combined – radical feminism
 V sign – voluntarism, peace, victory
 Weighing scale – law, justice

Bangladesh 

 Boat – Bangladesh Awami League
 Sheaf of Paddy – Bangladesh Nationalist Party

Brazil 

Red Star – Workers' Party (Brazil)
Rose (symbolism) — Democratic Labour Party (Brazil)
Toucan – Brazilian Social Democracy Party

Cambodia 

Devata – Cambodian People's Party

Canada 

 Red maple leaf — Liberal Party of Canada
 Red maple leaf within the letter C — Conservative Party of Canada
 Orange maple leaf — New Democratic Party

Colombia 

 letter C – Colombian Conservative Party
 letter L – Colombian Liberal Party
 letter U – Social National Unity Party ("Party of the U")

Denmark 

 letter A – Social Democrats
 letter B – Social Liberal Party
 letter C – Conservative People's Party
 letter F – Socialist People's Party
 letter I – Liberal Alliance
 letter K – Christian Democrats
 letter N – People's Movement against the EU
 letter O – Danish People's Party
 letter Ø – Red-Green Alliance
 letter V – Venstre, Liberal Party of Denmark

India 

 Ard – Bodoland People's Front (Jharkhand)
 Arrow – Janata Dal (United) (Bihar, Jharkhand, Karnataka, Nagaland)
 Banana – All Jharkhand Students Union (Jharkhand)
 Bicycle – Jammu and Kashmir National Panthers Party (Jammu and Kashmir), Samajwadi Party (Uttar Pradesh), Telugu Desam Party (Andhra Pradesh)
 Book – National People's Party
 Bow and Arrow – Jharkhand Mukti Morcha (Jharkhand), Shiv Sena (Maharashtra)
 Broom – Aam Aadmi Party
 Bungalow – Lok Janshakti Party (Bihar)
 Candles – People's Democratic Front (Meghalaya)
 Car – Telangana Rashtra Samithi
 Ceiling fan – Rashtriya Lok Samta Party (Bihar), YSR Congress Party (Andhra Pradesh, Telangana)
 Clock – Nationalist Congress Party
 Coconut – Goa Forward Party (Goa)
 Conch – Biju Janata Dal (Odisha)
 Crown – People's Democratic Alliance (Meghalaya)
 Dao – Indigenous People's Front of Tripura (Tripura)
 Drum  – United Democratic Party (Meghalaya) (Meghalaya)
 Ears of maize and sickle – Communist Party of India
 Elephant – Asom Gana Parishad (Assam), Bahujan Samaj Party (with the exception of the states of Assam and Sikkim where certain state parties use the elephant)
 Five-pointed star – Mizo National Front (Mizoram)
 Farmer ploughing (within square farm) – Janta Congress Chhattisgarh (Chhattisgarh)
 Flowers and grass – All India Trinamool Congress
 Glasses – Indian National Lok Dal (Haryana)
 Globe – Nationalist Democratic Progressive Party (Nagaland)
 Hammer and Sickle – Communist Party of India
 Hammer, Sickle and Star – Communist Party of India (Marxist)
 Hand pump – Rashtriya Lok Dal (Uttar Pradesh)
 Hurricane lamp – Rashtriya Janata Dal (Bihar, Jharkhand)
 Ink pot and pen – People's Democratic Party (Jammu and Kashmir)
 Jug – All India N.R. Congress (Puducherry)
 Key – Jannayak Janta Party (Haryana)
 Light-bulb – Mizoram People's Conference (Mizoram)
 Locomotive – Maharashtra Navnirman Sena (Maharashtra)
 Maize – People's Party of Arunachal (Arunachal Pradesh)
 Mango – Pattali Makkal Katchi (Puducherry)
 Kite – People's Party of Punjab (Punjab), All India Majlis-e-Ittehadul Muslimeen (Telangana)
 Ladder – Muslim League (Kerala)
 Lady farmer carrying paddy on her head – Janata Dal (Secular) (Arunachal Pradesh, Karnataka, Kerala)
 Lion – All India Forward Bloc (West Bengal), Hill State People's Democratic Party (Meghalaya), Maharashtrawadi Gomantak Party (Goa)
 Lock and key –  All India United Democratic Front (Assam)
 Lotus – Bharatiya Janata Party
 Nagara – Desiya Murpokku Dravida Kazhagam (Tamil Nadu)
 Palm (of hand) – Indian National Congress
 Plough – Jammu & Kashmir National Conference (Jammu and Kashmir)
 Rooster – Naga People's Front (Manipur, Nagaland)
 Spade and ashpan rake – Revolutionary Socialist Party (Kerala, West Bengal)
 Spectacles – Indian National Lok Dal (Haryana)
 Rising sun – Dravida Munnetra Kazhagam (Tamil Nadu)
 Sun without rays – Zoram Nationalist Party (Mizoram)
 Table lamp – Sikkim Krantikari Morcha (Sikkim)
 Telephone – Himachal Vikas Congress (Himachal Pradesh)
 Two leaves – All India Anna Dravida Munnetra Kazhagam (Tamil Nadu), Kerala Congress (M) (Kerala)
 Umbrella – Sikkim Democratic Front (Sikkim)
 Water bottle – Rashtriya Loktantrik Party (Rajasthan)
 Weighing scale – Shiromani Akali Dal (Punjab)

Nepal 

 Balance - Sajha Party
 Bus - Nepal Federal Socialist Party
 Khukuri - Sanghiya Loktantrik Rastriya Manch
 Madal - Nepal Majdoor Kisan Party

 Plough - Rastriya Prajatantra Party
 Smiley - Bibeksheel Nepali Dal
 Sun - Nepal Communist Party

 Tree - Nepali Congress
 Tumbler - Rastriya Janamorcha
 Umbrella - People's Socialist Party, Nepal

The Netherlands 

 Ancient Greek temple – Forum for Democracy
 Seagull – Party for Freedom
 Red rose – Labour Party
 Tomato – Socialist Party

Pakistan 

 Arrow – Pakistan Peoples Party
 Balance – Jamaat-e-Islami Pakistan (JI)
 Book – Jamiat Ulema-e-Islam (JUI)
 Cricket Bat – Pakistan Tehreek-e-Insaaf
 Kite – Muttahida Qaumi Movement (MQM)
 Lantern - Awami National Party (ANP)
 Sunflower – Green Party of Pakistan
 Tiger – Pakistan Muslim League (N)

Slovakia 

 Christian cross – Christian Democratic Movement
 Blue cube – Slovak Democratic and Christian Union – Democratic Party
 Flying dove – Free Forum
 Eagle – Slovak National Party
 Red Star – Communist Party of Slovakia
 Letter S – People's Party – Movement for a Democratic Slovakia
 Stork – Christian Democratic Movement

Sweden 

 Black sail – Pirate Party
 Cornflower – Liberals (pre-2016)
 Dandelion – Green Party 
 Four-leaf clover – Centre Party
 Hepatica – Sweden Democrats
 letter L – Liberals
 letter M – Moderate Party
 Red carnation – Left Party 
 Red rose – Social Democrats
 Wood anemone – Christian Democrats (pre-2017)

Turkey 

 Bee – Motherland Party 
 Dolphin – Liberal Democratic Party
 Dove – Democratic Left Party
 Horse – Democrat Party
 Kayı tribe symbol – Good Party
 Light bulb – Justice and Development Party
 Six arrows – Justice and Development Party (Turkey)
 Three crescents – Nationalist Movement Party

United Kingdom 

 Bee - Co-operative Party
 Earth with sunflower petals – Green Party of England and Wales
 Griffin – Libertarian Party
 Liberty Bird – Liberal Democrats
 Lion – Democratic Unionist Party, Britain First, UK Independence Party (2017-2018), Young Conservatives (UK)
 Pound sign – UK Independence Party (1993–2017)
 Red House - Aspire (political party)
 Red Rose – Labour Party
 Saltire – the Scottish National Party and Scottish Conservative Party both use stylised saltires in their party logos
 Scribbled oak tree – Conservative Party
 Shovel - Labour Party (UK) until 1983
 Stylised P-shaped Flag – Pirate Party UK
 Sunflower – Scottish Green Party
 Torch – Former logo of the Labour Party (1920s to 1983) and the Conservative Party (1980s to 2006).
 Union Flag – Used in the logos of the Ulster Unionist Party, Democratic Unionist Party, British National Party, Conservative Party (traditional), amongst others
 Welsh Dragon – Former logo of Plaid Cymru; also appeared alongside the thistle, daffodil and clover leaf on the post-war Tory logo
 Welsh poppy – Plaid Cymru
 White Rose – Logo of the Yorkshire Party, symbol of Yorkshire as a whole

United States 

 Abraham Lincoln – Republican Party, used on some paper ballots in US; also used as a fundraising symbol (such as with the party's annual "Lincoln Dinner" in many states). Also used by the Modern Whig Party due to Lincoln's loyalty to the original Whig Party.
 Bear – California National Party
 Benjamin Franklin – Democratic Party, used on some paper ballots in US
 Bird – Unofficial symbol of the Progressive wing of the Democratic Party
 Black and white cockade - Federalist Party
 Donkey – Democratic Party
 Eagle – Republican Party (used on ballots in New York State); Constitution Party, American Party
 Elephant – Republican Party
 Great horned owl – Modern Whig Party
 Lady Justice – Justice Party
 Lion – National Party
 Minute Man and Embattled Farmer are the symbols of American Patriot Party (2003 to present)
 Moose – Vermont Progressive Party; also used since 1912 for the National Progressive Party
 Panther – Black Panther Party
 Pelican – American Solidarity Party. Used for its association with Christian democracy.
 Penguin- used in some states as a symbol of the Libertarian Party
 Porcupine-used as a symbol of the Free State Project in New Hampshire and Libertarian ideas and movements in general
 Raccoon – Whig Party
 Rattlesnake – Sometimes used on the logos for the Texas state affiliate of the Modern Whig Party.
 Red Rose – Democratic Socialists of America
 Red, white and blue cockade - Democratic-Republican Party
 Star – Democratic Party (used on ballots in New York State)
 Statue of Liberty – Libertarian Party. Also a national symbol
 Sunflower – Green Party; also, Republican presidential candidate Alfred Landon of Kansas in 1936
 Thomas Jefferson and Andrew Jackson – Democratic Party – used as a fundraising symbol (such as with the party's annual "Jefferson-Jackson Dinner" in many states)
 Tiger – formerly, the New York City Democratic Party and the Tammany Hall political machine that controlled it for more than a century and a half.
 Torch – Conservative Party of New York; Libertarian Party
 Zachary Taylor – In some rare instances the Modern Whig Party has used the portrait of the 12th President of the United States in his military uniform to show their heritage as the old Whig Party and their connection with military veterans.

References

Political parties
Party symbols
Symbols
Parties
Symbols